Elections for the 43 seats in the Tibetan Parliament in Exile were held on April 25, 1996. Organized by the Tibetan Electoral Commission, participation was reported at some 32880 votes. Tibetans in exile elected representatives from the three historical regions of Tibet, the four classic Tibetan Buddhist schools, the traditional pre-Buddhist Bön religion and representatives of the exile community in Europe and the Americas. Three members were appointed by the Dalai Lama. The Samdhong Rinpoche y Thupten Lungrig were elected president and vice-president of the Parliament.

Results

References 

1996
1996 elections in Asia